Heliconia riopalenquensis is a species of plant in the family Heliconiaceae. It is endemic to Ecuador.  Its natural habitats are subtropical or tropical moist lowland forest and subtropical or tropical moist montane forest.

References

riopalenquensis
Endemic flora of Ecuador
Vulnerable plants
Taxonomy articles created by Polbot